The 64th Boat Race took place on 16 March 1907.  Held annually, the Boat Race is a side-by-side rowing race between crews from the Universities of Oxford and Cambridge along the River Thames.  Cambridge were reigning champions, having won the previous year's race, and more than half their crew had already participated in the event. In a race umpired by Frederick I. Pitman, Cambridge won by  lengths in a time of 20 minutes 26 seconds.  It was their second consecutive victory and their fifth win in six races, taking the overall record in the event to 34–29 in Oxford's favour.

Background

The Boat Race is a side-by-side rowing competition between the University of Oxford (sometimes referred to as the "Dark Blues") and the University of Cambridge (sometimes referred to as the "Light Blues").  The race was first held in 1829, and since 1845 has taken place on the  Championship Course on the River Thames in southwest London.  The rivalry is a major point of honour between the two universities; it is followed throughout the United Kingdom and, as of 2015, broadcast worldwide.  Cambridge went into the race as reigning champions, having won the 1906 race by  lengths, while Oxford led overall with 34 victories to Cambridge's 28 (excluding the "dead heat" of 1877).

Cambridge were coached by Francis Escombe (for the fourth consecutive year), Stanley Muttlebury, five-time Blue between 1886 and 1890, and David Alexander Wauchope (who had rowed in the 1895 race).  Oxford's coaches were Harcourt Gilbey Gold (Dark Blue president for the 1900 race and four-time Blue) and H. W. Willis.  The umpire for the fifth year was old Etonian and former Cambridge rower Frederick I. Pitman who rowed in the 1884, 1885 and 1886 races.

Crews
Oxford's crew contained three rowers with Boat Race experience, including Henry Bucknall who was rowing in his third consecutive event. Cambridge saw five participants return to their boat, including Banner Johnstone who had rowed in both 1904 and 1906. All of those taking part in the race were registered as British.

Late in the previous summer, and following the Henley Royal Regatta, Cambridge were challenged to a race along the Championship Course by Harvard University:  Cambridge won by two lengths.  The Light Blues made only two changes to personnel for this year's Boat Race, and as noted by author and former Oxford rower George Drinkwater, "had a crew almost ready-made".

Race

Oxford won the toss and elected to start from the Surrey station, handing the Middlesex side of the river to Cambridge.  Although the bend of the river provided the Dark Blues with an early advantage, Cambridge were ahead and clear within a minute and a half.  Rating slightly slower than the Dark Blues, they passed the Mile Post two lengths up and held a three-length lead as they passed below Hammersmith Bridge.  Oxford's stroke Albert Gladstone spurted in an attempt to draw his boat back into the contest, and stroke by stroke the gap was reduced, eventually to a few feet.
 
Encountering rough water, Oxford had to work hard to remain in contention but at Chiswick, began to fall back rapidly.  Even after reducing their stroke rate, Cambridge pulled further away to lead by four lengths at Barnes Bridge.  They eased up to win by  lengths in a time of 20 minutes 26 seconds, their second consecutive victory and their fifth win in six races.  It was the largest winning margin since the 1904 race and took the overall record in the event to 34–29 in Oxford's favour.

References
Notes

Bibliography

External links
 Official website

1907 in English sport
The Boat Race
March 1907 sports events
1907 sports events in London